The Doubles' sprint race of the 2016 FIL World Luge Championships was held on 29 January 2016.

Results
The qualification run was started at 09:00 and the final run at 14:48.

References

Doubles' sprint